Fluffy Gardens is an Irish preschool animation television show created, written and directed by Jason Tammemagi and produced by Monster Animation & Design Ltd. Each seven-minute episode tells the story of a different character. Characters include Paolo the Cat, Lola the Mosquito, Stinky the Skunk, Wee Reg the Puppy, George the Mean Yellow Dog, Mavis the Pony, Mindy the Flamingo, Harold the Shark, Sebastian the Kangaroo, Sparkles the Monkey, Tooty the Elephant, Lenny the Octopus, Fudge and Lily the Kittens, Una the Owl, Mr. Johnson the Panda, Mia the Tapir, Mildred the Mole, Polly the Pelican, Chuckles the Chicken, Babs the Baby Bird, Star the Sea Anemone, Bill the Platypus, Camille the Crocodile, Floella the Fruit Bat, Henny the Hippopotamus, Royston the Mantis, The Small Green Thing, Pertree the Bear, Max the Zebra, Cornelius the Crab, Nigel the Naughty Brown Mouse, Poppy the Tiger, Terence the Toad, Scoopy the Pink Rabbit, Colleen the Cow and Rex the Pig. The show is distributed internationally by Target Entertainment.

The show has aired on Raidió Teilifís Éireann (currently airs on RTÉ2 and RTÉjr) in Ireland, Cartoonito and CITV in the UK, Australian Broadcasting Corporation in Australia and Discovery Kids in Latin America (as Fofópolis in Brazil and Fabulópolis in Hispanic America), Knowledge Kids and TVOKids in Canada and Smile of a Child in the United States. The show has sold in over 100 countries worldwide.

Plot
The show focuses on many creatures with different colors on their fur called the Fluffy Gardens - Paolo the Cat, Lola the Mosquito, Stinky the Skunk, Wee Reg the Puppy, George the Mean Yellow Dog, Mavis the Pony, Mindy the Flamingo, Harold the Shark, Sebastian the Kangaroo, Sparkles the Monkey, Tooty the Elephant, Lenny the Octopus, Mr Johnson the Panda and Colleen the Cow.

References

2007 Irish television series debuts
2016 Irish television series endings
Irish children's animated television series
Irish flash animated television series
2000s animated television series
2010s animated television series
Animated preschool education television series
Irish preschool education television series
2000s preschool education television series
2010s preschool education television series
English-language television shows